Hypopta is a genus of moths in the family Cossidae.

Species
 Hypopta actileuca Dyar, 1918
 Hypopta aethiops Herrich-Schäffer, 1855
 Hypopta albicosta Hering, 1923
 Hypopta albipuncta Schaus, 1921
 Hypopta ambigua  Hübner, 1818
 Hypopta amundasa  Druce, 1890
 Hypopta aquila  Dognin, 1916
 Hypopta brunneomaculata (Dyar & Schaus, 1937)
 Hypopta caestoides  Herrich-Schäffer, 1853
 Hypopta centrosoma  Dyar, 1925
 Hypopta cinerea  Schaus, 1911
 Hypopta clymene  Schaus, 1921
 Hypopta corrientina  Berg, 1882
 Hypopta crassiplaga  Schaus, 1905
 Hypopta delicata  Schaus, 1921
 Hypopta garsasia  Dognin, 1916
 Hypopta giacomelli  Köhler, 1924
 Hypopta guiguasia  Dognin, 1916
 Hypopta inguromorpha  Schaus, 1905
 Hypopta invida  Dognin, 1916
 Hypopta invidiosa  Dognin, 1923
 Hypopta mendosensis  Berg, 1882
 Hypopta monsalvei  Ureta, 1957
 Hypopta nigrisparsata  Dognin, 1816
 Hypopta pallidicosta (Schaus, 1901)
 Hypopta palmata  Barnes & McDunnough, 1910
 Hypopta racana  Dognin, 1920
 Hypopta ramulosa  Dognin, 1920
 Hypopta rubiginosa  Herrich-Schäffer, 1853
 Hypopta selenophora  Hering, 1923
 Hypopta sibirica  Alphéraky, 1895
 Hypopta superba  Berg, 1882
 Hypopta triarcatata  Schaus, 1905
 Hypopta variegata  Köhler, 1924
 Hypopta vassilia  Schaus, 1921

Former species
 Hypopta agavis
 Hypopta anna  Dyar, 1898
 Hypopta chilodora  Dyar, 1910
 Hypopta clathrata  Dognin, 1910
 Hypopta cognata  Krüger, 1939
 Hypopta ethela  Neumoegen & Dyar, 1894
 Hypopta francesca  Dyar, 1909
 Hypopta herzi  Alphéraky, 1893
 Hypopta intractatus  Staudinger, 1887
 Hypopta itzalana  Strecker, 1900
 Hypopta lignosus  Brandt, 1938
 Hypopta mussolinii  Turati, 1927
 Hypopta nana  Strecker, 1876
 Hypopta nycteris  John, 1923
 Hypopta salome  Dyar, 1910
 Hypopta sterila  Dognin, 1910
 Hypopta sumbannus  Alphéraky & Rothschild, 1912
 Hypopta tekkensis  Alphéraky & Rothschild, 1912
 Hypopta theodori  Dyar, 1893
 Hypopta thrips  Hübner, 1818
 Hypopta vaulogeri  Staudinger, 1897
 Hypopta zoroastres  Grum-Grshimailo, 1902

References

External links

Natural History Museum Lepidoptera generic names catalog

Hypoptinae
Cossidae genera